Neofibularia is a genus of sponges belonging to the family Biemnidae.

The species of this genus are found in Australia and America.

Species:

Neofibularia chinensis 
Neofibularia hartmani 
Neofibularia irata 
Neofibularia mordens 
Neofibularia nolitangere

References

Heteroscleromorpha
Sponge genera